U.S. Route 270 (US 270) was a proposed U.S. Highway that was planned for the northern part of Georgia and the western part of North Carolina. Its western terminus was to be at US 29/Georgia State Route 8 (SR 8) and SR 13 in Lawrenceville; while its eastern terminus was slated to be at US 25/US 70/North Carolina Highway 10/North Carolina Highway 20/North Carolina Highway 29 (US 25/US 70/NC 10/NC 20/NC 29) in Asheville. US 270 was to travel concurrently with SR 13 from Lawrenceville to Gainesville; SR 11 from Gainesville to the North Carolina state line, north-northwest of Blairsville; and NC 10 for its entire length in North Carolina. The highway was proposed in 1925 and canceled in 1927. It was replaced by SR 13, US 19, SR 11, and NC 10.

Route description

Georgia
US 270 was planned to begin at an intersection with US 29/SR 8 and SR 13 in Lawrenceville. It proceeded north-northwest to Buford, concurrently with SR 13. There, they were to meet the southern terminus of SR 68. US 270/SR 13 headed northeast to Gainesville. There, they met SR 11 and the northern terminus of US 129. Here, SR 11 joined the concurrency. Almost immediately afterward, SR 13 split off to the northeast, while US 270/SR 11 headed to the north-northeast. In Clermont, they met the southern terminus of SR 43. In Cleveland, the highways curved to the west-northwest, to an intersection with the northern terminus of SR 9. They headed to the north-northwest and curved to the northwest. In Blairsville, they met SR 2. They curved back to the north-northeast and reached the North Carolina state line. Here, SR 11 ended, and US 270 began a concurrency with NC 10.

North Carolina
US 270 and NC 10 traveled north through Belview and curved to the north-northeast. In Murphy, they intersected NC 28. They curved to the northeast, traveling through Tomotla, Marble, and Andrews. There, they headed to the east-southeast to Valleytown. They headed northeast again, through Rhode, and entered Topton. There, they intersected the southern terminus of NC 108. After traveling through Nantahala, Wesser, and Almond, they met the northern terminus of NC 286. East-northeast of there, the highways traveled through Bryson City. Just northwest of Whittier, US 270 and NC 10 met the southern terminus of NC 107. They curved to the southeast, traveling through Whittier and Wilmot, before entering Dillsboro. There, they met the northern terminus of NC 285. Heading to the east-northeast, they met the northern terminus of NC 106 in Sylva. They traveled through Beta, Addie, Balsam, and Hazelwood, before entering Waynesville. There, they intersected NC 284. Just northeast of the city, they met the southern terminus of NC 209. They headed to the east-southeast, traveling through Clyde and Canton. They curved to the east-northeast, traveling through Turnpike, Luther, and Candler. Just before entering Asheville, they curved back to the east-southeast. In Asheville, US 270 reached its eastern terminus, an intersection with US 25/US 70/NC 10/NC 20/NC 29.

History
US 270 was proposed in 1925. In 1927, it was canceled. It was replaced by US 19 from Lawrenceville to Andrews and from Dillsboro to Asheville, SR 13 from Lawrenceville to Gainesville, SR 11 from Gainesville to the North Carolina state line, and NC 10 from the state line to Asheville.

The US 270 corridor now consists of SR 20 from Lawrenceville to the Buford area, SR 124 in Lawrenceville, US 23 from Buford to Gainesville, SR 13 from the Sugar Hill–Buford line to Gainesville, SR 11 Bus. in Gainesville, SR 11 from Gainesville to the North Carolina state line, US 129 from Gainesville to Topton, US 19 from northwest of Cleveland to southwest of Bryson City, SR 75 Alt. in the Cleveland area, SR 180 south-southeast of Blairsville, US 76/SR 2/SR 515 in the Blairsville area, US 64 from Ranger to Murphy, US 74 from Ranger to Asheville, NC 28 from Almond to Lauada, US 441 in the Dillsboro area, US 23 from Dillsboro to Asheville, US 276 from Dellwood to Lake Junaluska, and NC 215 in Canton. The current path is approximately

Major intersections

See also

References

External links

70-2 (Georgia-North Carolina)
2 (Georgia-North Carolina)
70-2
70-2
Transportation in Gwinnett County, Georgia
Transportation in Hall County, Georgia
Transportation in White County, Georgia
Transportation in Lumpkin County, Georgia
Transportation in Union County, Georgia
Transportation in Cherokee County, North Carolina
Transportation in Swain County, North Carolina
Transportation in Jackson County, Georgia
Transportation in Haywood County, North Carolina
Transportation in Buncombe County, North Carolina
Buford, Georgia
Gainesville, Georgia
Waynesville, North Carolina
Asheville, North Carolina